Sach may refer to:
 Sach people, an ethnic group of Vietnam
 Sach language, an Austroasiatic language 
 Saj, Iran, also known as Sach, a village in Iran
 Sač, a utensil used in Balkan cuisine

People with the name 
 Sach, member of the hip-hop duo The Nonce
 Amelia Sach (1873–1903), British murderer
 Andrew Sach, Christian speaker and author
 Andrii Sach (born 1990), Ukrainian cyclist
 Tomáš Šach (born 1947), Czechoslovak canoer
 Warren Sach (born 1946), UN official

See also 
 Daily Sach, an Indian newspaper
 Saach Pass, a mountain pass in North India
 Sachs
 Satch (disambiguation)
 Sache (disambiguation)